Jeff Saibene (born 13 September 1968) is a Luxembourgish former professional footballer and manager of Swiss Challenge League club Neuchâtel Xamax.

Personal life
Saibene is a citizen of both Luxembourg and Switzerland and married with a Swiss wife. He is a fan of Hamburger SV.

Club career
He played most of his club football abroad, predominantly in Switzerland, but also in Belgium for Standard Liège. He began and ended his playing career in his native Luxembourg.

International career
As a defensive midfielder or defender, Saibene played for Luxembourg's national team 63 times between 1986 and 2001. He played in 27 FIFA World Cup qualification matches.

He played his final international game in October 2001, a World Cup qualification loss at Yugoslavia.

Coaching career
Saibene was the manager of FC Aarau, in Switzerland and assistant to Allan Simonsen at the national team. He was formerly the assistant manager to Ryszard Komornicki at Aarau but was promoted in June 2009 when Komornicki left the club. He then managed Luxembourg U-21. He left his position in March 2011 to coach FC St. Gallen.

On 19 March 2017, he was appointed as the new head coach of Arminia Bielefeld. He was sacked on 10 December 2018.

He was appointed as the new head coach of FC Ingolstadt for the 2019–20 season. He was sacked on 9 March 2020.

On 2 October 2020, he was named head coach of 1. FC Kaiserslautern. He was sacked on 30 January 2021.

In June 2021, he was named new head coach of Racing FC Union Luxembourg.

On 29 August 2022, he returned to Switzerland to take over coaching duties of struggling Swiss Challenge League side Neuchâtel Xamax.

Managerial

Honours

As player
Union Luxembourg
 Luxembourg Cup: 1985–86

FC Aarau
 Swiss National League A: 1992–93

As manager
St. Gallen
 Swiss Challenge League: 2011–12

Racing Union
 Luxembourg Cup: 2021–22

References

External links

Player profile – Standard Liège

1968 births
Living people
Luxembourgian footballers
Luxembourg international footballers
Luxembourgian expatriate footballers
Racing FC Union Luxembourg players
Standard Liège players
FC Aarau players
FC Locarno players
FC Swift Hesperange players
Belgian Pro League players
Swiss Super League players
Expatriate footballers in Switzerland
Expatriate footballers in Belgium
Luxembourgian football managers
FC Aarau managers
BSC Old Boys players
FC St. Gallen managers
FC Thun managers
Arminia Bielefeld managers
FC Ingolstadt 04 managers
1. FC Kaiserslautern managers
Neuchâtel Xamax FCS managers
2. Bundesliga managers
3. Liga managers
Luxembourgian expatriate football managers
Association football midfielders
Luxembourgian expatriate sportspeople in Switzerland
Luxembourgian expatriate sportspeople in Belgium
FC Monthey players
Luxembourgian expatriate sportspeople in Germany